The World Anti-Doping Agency (WADA; , AMA) is a foundation initiated by the International Olympic Committee based in Canada to promote, coordinate, and monitor the fight against drugs in sports. The agency's key activities include scientific research, education, development of anti-doping capacities, and monitoring of the World Anti-Doping Code, whose provisions are enforced by the UNESCO International Convention Against Doping in Sport. The aims of the Council of Europe Anti-Doping Convention and the United States Anti-Doping Agency are also closely aligned with those of WADA.

History

The World Anti-Doping Agency is a foundation created through a collective initiative led by the International Olympic Committee (IOC). It was set up on 10 November 1999 in Lausanne, Switzerland, as a result of what was called the "Declaration of Lausanne", to promote, coordinate and monitor the fight against drugs in sports. Since 2002, the organization's headquarters have been located in Montreal, Quebec, Canada. The Lausanne office became the regional office for Europe. Other regional offices have been established in Africa, Asia/Oceania and Latin America. WADA is responsible for the World Anti-Doping Code, adopted by more than 650 sports organizations, including international sports federations, national anti-doping organizations, the IOC, and the International Paralympic Committee. , its president is Witold Banka.

Initially funded by the International Olympic Committee, WADA receives half of its budgetary requirements from them, with the other half coming from various national governments. Its governing bodies are also composed in equal parts by representatives from the sporting movement (including athletes) and governments of the world. The Agency's key activities include scientific research, education, development of anti-doping capacities, and monitoring of the World Anti-Doping Code.

Organization
The highest decision-making authority in WADA is the 38-member foundation board, which is comprised equally of IOC representatives and representatives of national governments. The Foundation Board appoints the agency's president. Most day-to-day management is delegated to a 12-member executive committee, membership of which is also split equally between the IOC and governments. There also exist several sub-committees with narrower remits, including a Finance and Administration Committee and an Athlete Committee peopled by athletes.

WADA is an international organisation. It delegates work in individual countries to Regional and National Anti-Doping Organizations (RADOs and NADOs) and mandates that these organisations are compliant with the World Anti-Doping Code. WADA also accredits around 30 laboratories to perform the required scientific analysis for doping control.

The statutes of WADA and the World Anti-Doping Code mandate the Court of Arbitration for Sport's ultimate jurisdiction in deciding doping-related cases.

Executive committee

World Anti-Doping Code 

The World Anti-Doping Code is a document published by WADA that approximately 700 sports organizations across the world are signatories to. The code "harmonizes anti-doping policies, rules, and regulations within sport organizations and among public authorities" for the purpose of "protect[ing] the athletes' fundamental right to participate in doping-free sport". The code is supplemented by eight international standards published by WADA covering the topics of prohibited substances, testing and investigations, laboratories, Therapeutic Use Exemptions, protection of privacy and personal information, code compliance by signatories, education, and results management. The most recent version of the code took effect on 1 January 2021.

In 2004, the World Anti-Doping Code was implemented by sports organizations prior to the Olympic Games in Athens, Greece. In November 2007, more than 600 sports organizations (international sports federations, national anti-doping organizations, the International Olympic Committee, the International Paralympic Committee, and a number of professional leagues in various countries of the world) unanimously adopted a revised Code at the Third World Conference on Doping in Sport, to take effect on 1 January 2009.

In 2013, further amendments to the Code were approved, doubling the sanction for a first offence where intentional doping is established, but allowing for more lenient sanctions for inadvertent rule violations or for athletes co-operating with anti-doping agencies. The updated code came into effect on 1 January 2015.

On 16 November 2017, WADA's Foundation Board initiated the 2021 Code Review Process, which also involved simultaneous review of the International Standards. During this time, stakeholders had multiple opportunities to contribute and make recommendations on how to further strengthen the global anti-doping program. Following the review process, stakeholders were invited to intervene publicly on the proposed Code and Standards during the Agency's Fifth World Conference on Doping in Sport in Katowice, Poland – an opportunity which was taken up by over 70 stakeholder organizations – before the Code and the full suite of Standards were approved by the Foundation Board and executive committee respectively.

Council of Europe Anti-Doping Convention 
The Anti-Doping Convention of the Council of Europe in Strasbourg was opened for signature on 16 December 1989 as the first multilateral legal standard in this field. It has been signed by 52 states including all 47 member states of the Council of Europe and non-member states Australia, Belarus, Canada, Morocco, and Tunisia. The convention is open for signature by other non-European states. It does not claim to create a universal model of anti-doping, but sets a certain number of common standards and regulations requiring parties to adopt legislative, financial, technical, educational and other measures. In this sense the Convention strives for the same general aims as WADA, without being directly linked to it.

The main objective of the convention is to promote the national and international harmonization of the measures to be taken against doping. Furthermore, the Convention describes the mission of the monitoring group set up in order to monitor its implementation and periodically re-examine the list of prohibited substances and methods which can be found in an annex to the main text. An additional protocol to the Convention entered into force on 1 April 2004 with the aim of ensuring the mutual recognition of anti-doping controls and of reinforcing the implementation of the Convention using a binding control system.

UNESCO International Convention Against Doping in Sport 

Given that many governments cannot be legally bound by a non-governmental document such as the World Anti-Doping Code, they are implementing it by individually ratifying the UNESCO International Convention against Doping in Sport, the first global international treaty against doping in sport, which was unanimously adopted by 191 governments at the UNESCO General Conference in October 2005 and came into force in February 2007. As of April 2020, 189 states had ratified the convention, setting a UNESCO record in terms of speed.

The UNESCO Convention is a practical and legally binding tool enabling governments to align domestic policy with the World Anti-Doping Code, thus harmonizing the rules governing anti-doping in sport. It formalizes governments' commitment to the fight against doping in sport, including by facilitating doping controls and supporting national testing programs; encouraging the establishment of "best practice" in the labelling, marketing, and distribution of products that might contain prohibited substances; withholding financial support from those who engage in or support doping; taking measures against manufacturing and trafficking; encouraging the establishment of codes of conduct for professions relating to sport and anti-doping; and funding education and research.

Criticism

Statistical validity of tests 
Professor Donald A. Berry has argued that the closed systems used by anti-doping agencies do not allow statistical validation of the tests. This argument was seconded by an accompanying editorial in the journal Nature (7 August 2008). The anti-doping community and scientists familiar with anti-doping work rejected these arguments. On 30 October 2008, Nature (Vol 455) published a letter to the editor from WADA countering Berry's article. However, there has been at least one case where the development of statistical decision limit used by WADA in HGH use testing was found invalid by the Court of Arbitration for Sport.

Sun Yang doping controversy 

In 2018, Chinese swimmer Sun Yang destroyed samples taken during an anti-doping test. In justification, the Doping Control Officer (DCO) in charge of the testing mission was later criticized by Sun Yang, Chinese media, journalists, and scholars for not following the proper protocols. FINA's Doping Panel cleared Sun of wrongdoings. However, WADA appealed the decision to the Court of Arbitration for Sport. A three-member CAS panel found Sun guilty of refusing to co-operate with sample testers and banned him from competitive swimming until February 2028. However, the CAS's decision has been criticized. On December 22, 2020, the Swiss Federal Tribunal set the CAS award aside due to the bias of the president of the panel, who previously tweeted anti-Chinese racial slurs. It was further found that another arbitrator, Romano Subiotto, has been sitting on a WADA's working group. This ban was subsequently reduced to 4 years and 3 months instead of the 8 years it was previously, meaning Sun would be able to participate in the 2024 Olympics.

Whereabouts rule 

The anti-doping code revised the whereabouts system in place since 2004, under which, athletes are required to select one hour per day, seven days a week to be available for no-notice drugs tests.

This was unsuccessfully challenged at law in 2009 by Sporta, the Belgian sports union, arguing that the system violated article 8 of the European Convention on Human Rights; and by FIFPro, the international umbrella group of football players' unions, basing its case on data protection and employment law.

A significant number of sports organizations, governments, athletes, and other individuals and organizations have expressed support for the "whereabouts" requirements. The International Association of Athletics Federations and UK Sport are two of the most vocal supporters of this rule. Both FIFA and UEFA have criticized the system, citing privacy concerns, as has the BCCI.

WADA has published a Q&A explaining the rationale for the change.

National Football League 
It was revealed in May 2011 that the American National Football League (NFL), which had previously resisted more stringent drug testing, may allow WADA to conduct its drug tests instead of doing it in-house.  This could lead the way to testing for HGH, which had previously been without testing in professional American football. However, cooperation was stalemated because "blood-testing for human growth hormone in the NFL had been delayed by the NFL's players union, who had tried 'every possible way to avoid testing. As American football players do not participate in international sporting events, that issue is not a top priority for WADA.

Database leaks
In August 2016, the World Anti-Doping Agency reported the receipt of phishing emails sent to users of its database claiming to be official WADA communications requesting their login details. After reviewing the two domains provided by WADA, it was found that the websites' registration and hosting information were consistent with the Russian hacking group Fancy Bear. According to WADA, some of the data the hackers released had been forged.

Due to evidence of widespread doping by Russian athletes, WADA recommended that Russian athletes be barred from participating in the 2016 Rio Olympics and Paralympics. Analysts said they believed the hack was in part an act of retaliation against whistleblowing Russian athlete Yuliya Stepanova, whose personal information was released in the breach. In August 2016, WADA revealed that their systems had been breached, explaining that hackers from Fancy Bear had used an IOC-created account to gain access to their Anti-doping Administration and Management System (ADAMS) database. The hackers then used the website fancybear.net to leak what they said were the Olympic drug testing files of several American athletes who had received therapeutic use exemptions, including gymnast Simone Biles for methylphenidate, tennis players Venus Williams (for prednisone, prednisolone, triamcinolone, and formoterol), and Serena Williams (for oxycodone, hydromorphone, prednisone, prednisolone, and methylprednisolone), and basketball player Elena Delle Donne (for an amphetamine and hydrocortisone). The hackers honed in on athletes who had been granted exemptions by WADA for various reasons. Subsequent leaks included athletes from many other countries.

Reports

McLaren Report 

In 2016, Professor Richard McLaren, an independent investigator working on behalf of WADA published a second part of his report (first part was published in July 2016) showing that more than 1,000 Russians athletes in over 30 sports were involved in or benefited from state-sponsored doping from 2011 to 2015. As a result of the report, many Russian athletes were barred from participating in the 2018 Winter Olympics. Despite widely accepted evidence, in 2018 WADA lifted its ban on Russian athletes. The reinstatement was strongly criticized by, among others, Russian whistle blower Grigory Rodchenkov, and his lawyer, James Walden.

List of presidents

See also 

 Doping at the Asian Games
 Doping at the Olympics
 List of doping cases in sport
 Cannabis and sports

References

Further reading

External links 
 
 
 World Anti-Doping Agency criticises 'extremist' NFL players over HGH, The Guardian/AP, 28 March 2013
 WADA publishes Independent McLaren Investigations Report

Anti-doping organizations
Doping in sport
International organizations based in Canada
International sports bodies based in Switzerland
Olympic organizations
Organisations based in Lausanne
Organizations based in Montreal
1999 establishments in Switzerland
Sports organizations established in 1999
Sports rules and regulations